Harvey Samuel Irwin (December 10, 1844 – September 3, 1916) was a U.S. Representative from Kentucky.

Born in Highland County, Ohio, Irwin attended the public schools.
He was graduated from the high school of Greenfield, Ohio.
He studied law, but abandoned the same to enlist in the Union Army during the Civil War.
Assisted in raising a regiment of Artillery and was commissioned a lieutenant.
Transferred to a special corps in the Regular Army, in which he served until the close of the war.
He settled in Louisville, Kentucky.
He resumed the study of law.
He was admitted to the bar and practiced.
He was appointed successively assistant internal revenue assessor, deputy clerk of the United States district court, and chief deputy collector of the fifth internal revenue district of Kentucky.
Railroad commissioner in 1895.

Irwin was elected as a Republican to the Fifty-seventh Congress (March 4, 1901 – March 3, 1903).
He was an unsuccessful candidate for reelection in 1902.
He resumed the practice of law in Washington, D.C.
He was licensed as an evangelist in Washington, D.C., in 1913.
Had a charge in Idylwood and Vienna, Virginia.
He died in Vienna, Virginia, September 3, 1916.
He was interred in Cave Hill Cemetery, Louisville, Kentucky.

References

External links 

1844 births
1916 deaths
Burials at Cave Hill Cemetery
Kentucky lawyers
People from Highland County, Ohio
Politicians from Louisville, Kentucky
Union Army officers
Republican Party members of the United States House of Representatives from Kentucky
19th-century American politicians
19th-century American lawyers